Zapaturismo or Zapatourism is a tourist phenomenon in the Mexican state of Chiapas, prompted by the presence of the Zapatista Army of National Liberation (EZLN). The area is visited by national and international tourists who are attracted by the message, policies, and image of the Zapatistas, who claim to provide freedom, autonomy, and dignity to local indigenous communities.  The Rebel Zapatista Autonomous Municipalities in the region act as a gateway to the movement, a tendency which has been referred to as "political tourism".

The Zapaturismo phenomenon started in 1996 when the EZLN began inviting celebrities such as Oliver Stone, Edward James Olmos, and Danielle Mitterrand to visit the Lacandon Jungle in Chiapas. In recent years, however, the Zapatistas' support for Zapaturismo has waned. When Mexican president Andrés Manuel López Obrador started pushing for the construction of Tren Maya, a 948-mile railway which would connect archaeological sites along the Yucatán Peninsula and open up the region to further tourism, the EZLN denounced the project as "an open declaration of war". They explained that they felt the project served corporate interests rather than those of local communities, and that it would simply shuttle wealthy tourists from cultural site to cultural site without giving back to said communities. Any related jobs provided to locals, the Zapatistas argued, would not be "dignified", but would be focused on serving visitors. Concerns were also expressed regarding predatory commercial interests such as hotel chains seeking to profit off of indigenous cultures without genuine interest or commitment to them.

See also 
 Zapatista Army of National Liberation

References

Sources
 
 Nueva moda: el "zapaturismo"
 Insurgencia y turismo: reflexiones sobre el impacto del turista politizado en Chiapas

Zapatista Army of National Liberation